LivingStone International University (LIU) is a private university in Uganda near Mbale town. It is overseen by a board of directors composed of Christians from both Uganda and U.S. The university is non-denominational with no denomination oversight. Historically, it was founded by missionaries associate with the Churches of Christ and Christian Churches in the United States to provide a high-quality university education to a remote and underserved area in East Africa. Faculty and students participate in a mentoring program and a university environment that encompass spiritual, intellectual, interpersonal, and social-cultural dimensions of human development within a diverse student body.

Location

LIU opened in January 2012 on a leased campus near the center of Mbale, Uganda, by road it is approximately 250 kilometers (160 mi) northeast of Kampala, the capital and largest city in that country.[1] Its coordinates are: 1°05'03.0"N, 34°10'45.0"E (Latitude: 1.084167; Longitude: 34.179167). [2] LIU plans to occupy this leased campus until Phase 1 of the construction of the permanent campus is completed in June 2019, after which it will serve as an extension campus for evening courses and professional development programs.

The new fifty-acre campus is located just outside Mbale municipality on the main road that goes west toward Kampala. A campus master plan has been developed for the eventual construction of a campus that will serve 4,000 students. The coordinates of the permanent university campus entrance are: 1°04'26.0"N, 34°06'54.0"E (Latitude: 1.0793922; Longitude: 34.109314).

History
Planning for LivingStone International University began as early as 2006. The LivingStone International University Strategic Plan 2009-2014 was completed December 19, 2007 and submitted to the Uganda National Council for Higher Education (NCHE) with the goal of being chartered as a fully accredited university by the Uganda government. The first step in this process was accomplished December 19, 2008 when the NCHE issued to LIU a Letter of Interim Authority. This allowed LIU to begin buying property, prepare curricula, hire faculty and staff and set up banking and other business tasks. LIU received its Provisional License from the NCHE in March, 2011. This prepared the way for the first student intake in January, 2012. Currently LIU is working under the guidance of the NCHE toward qualifying for a full university the acquisition of the Charter.

On January 16, 2012, the inaugural class of LivingStone International University began with thirty-four students. With the second intake in September 2012, the student body grew to over fifty. In 2018 its enrollment reached almost 300. As of March 2019 over $5 million has been invested into the development of LIU, the acquisition of the land, the construction of Phase 1 A of the new campus, the addition of programs and schools, scholarships and operating funds for operational expenses.

Currently, the university has moved to Nasenyi, Kamonkoli, Budaka District. The infrastructure is growing progressively. The next phase is to start phase 1B with the construction of the main Administration Building. The building will be a multi-million dollar (Approximatively USD $4 M) The property has acquired its freehold land title at the beginning of the year 2021.

LivingStone International University has graduated 6 Classes since 2015 and around 86% of their graduates are either self-employed or employed by others. The university exist to transform Africa through quality education. It's vision is to produce ethical, employable Christian leaders in every sector of society. For that, it focuses on the use of full potential of its students. our programs are very practical. The university is called a "Personal University" because of education approach which is holistic. Our students are complete beings. No area of their lives remains untouched.

LIU is gender oriented and works for equal opportunity for both female and male students. Admission is done without discrimination of any sort as long as the applicant meets the necessary admission requirements for his/her program of interest as per Uganda National Council for Higher Education minimum standards. LivingStone International University accept both national and international applicants.

Academics

LIU offers both bachelors and diploma programs in five schools. The five schools are: School of Business; School of Christian Ministry; School of Education; School of Computing and Information Technology; and School of Media Technology. Additional relevant future programs are planned for the near future. The university also offers a certificate course in networking [Cisco CCNA] and security which takes six (6) to nine (9) months, English as a Second Language for students who come from countries whose official language is not English for six (6) months among other short term courses.

Innovation and technology
Each student at LIU is issued an electronic tablet or laptop as a medium for accessing textbooks as well as receiving other instructional materials and assignments from lecturers. There is currently a 1:5 computer-to-student ratio to provide technologically enhanced campus for the modern world that requires technological knowledge in the job market. Students in the Media Technology program receive hands-on experience in digital video and audio production on up-to-date equipment in the university's own studio. Students majoring in Computing and Information Technology have extensive hands-on training. Other programs utilize digital technology in various ways to enhance each program.

See also
 List of universities in Uganda
 List of university leaders in Uganda

References

External links

Budaka District
Eastern Region, Uganda
Universities and colleges in Uganda
Pentecostalism in Africa
Private universities and colleges
2012 establishments in Uganda
Educational institutions established in 2012